Anna was a weekly Italian women's fashion magazine based in Milan, Italy. It was in circulation in 1984 and 2013.

History and profile
The magazine was founded in 1984 on the ashes of the monthly Annabella, a famous magazine closed in the 1980s. The publisher was RCS Periodici, part of RCS MediaGroup. Anna was published on a weekly basis. In 2007 its title was renamed as A. The magazine had many sister publications, including another women's magazine Amica. In 2013 it ceased publication.

See also
List of magazines in Italy

References

1984 establishments in Italy
2013 disestablishments in Italy
Defunct magazines published in Italy
Italian-language magazines
Magazines established in 1984
Magazines disestablished in 2013
Magazines published in Milan
Weekly magazines published in Italy
Women's fashion magazines
Women's magazines published in Italy